Ọṣun, is an orisha, a spirit, a deity, or a goddess that reflects one of the manifestations of the Yorùbá Supreme Being in the Ifá oral tradition and Yoruba-based religions of West Africa. She is one of the most popular and venerated Orishas. Oshun is an important river deity among the Yorùbá people. She is the goddess of divinity, femininity, fertility, beauty and love. She is connected to destiny and divination.

During the life of the mortal Osun, she served as queen consort to King Shango of Oyo. Following her posthumous deification, she was admitted to the Yoruba pantheon as an aspect of a primordial divinity of the same name.

She is the patron saint of the Osun River in Nigeria, which bears her name. The river has its source in Ekiti State, in the west of Nigeria, and passes through the city of Osogbo, where Osun-Osogbo Sacred Grove, the principal sanctuary of the deity, is located. Oṣun is honored at the Osun-Osogbo Festival, a two-week-long annual festival that usually takes place in August, at the Oṣun-Osogbo Sacred Grove on the banks of the river.

Oṣun is one of the 401 Yoruba gods.

Primordial Oṣun 
According to the Ifa Literary Corpus, Ọṣun was the only female Irunmole (primordial spirit) sent to assist Shango to create the world by Olodumare. The other spirits that were sent began the work and ignored Ọṣun. Ọṣun went to her partner Shango for guidance. Two versions of this story exist. One claims that female spirits were tempted to take matters into their own hands, but all of their creative attempts failed because they acted without male spiritual leadership. Another version, and this one more consistent with the beginning of the story, claims that the male spirits attempted to make the world without female influence, and this exclusion is what caused the world to fail. The former version appears to reflect a patriarchal influence on orisha narratives that sprang up with the influence of Abrahamic religions, while the second is more in line with traditional orisha beliefs, which revere feminine power. Both story versions end with Shango forcing the other spirits hand to respect Oṣun as they would him. Through her sacrifice, Olodumare - the Supreme God - granted her the powers of an Oriṣa.

Mortal Oṣun 
While still a mortal, Oṣun is said to have gone to a drum festival one day and to have fallen in love with Shango. Since that day, Shango has been married to Oba, Oya, and Osun, though the last mentioned is said to be his favourite. Other stanzas in the Ifa Literary Corpus say that she was also married to Orunmila, who later became the Orisha of Wisdom and Divination.

It is also said that Oṣun was the first woman to be referred to as an Iyalode.

Ceremonies and ritual colors

Osun is the orisha of the river. Her devotees leave her offerings and perform ceremonies at bodies of fresh water such as rivers, streams and canals.
She is associated with the colors white, yellow, gold, and sometimes coral.

Abẹ̀bẹ̀
The Abẹ̀bẹ̀ is the ritual object most associated with Ọṣun. The Abẹ̀bẹ̀ is a fan in circular form.

Brazil
Ọṣun is a female orishá adopted and worshiped in all Afro-Brazilian religions. She is the orishá of the fresh water of rivers and waterfalls; of wealth and prosperity; of love; and of beauty. Followers seek help for romantic problems from Osun; the orisha is also responsible for marriage and other relationships. As the orishá of financial life, she is also called the "Lady of Gold". This referred to copper at one time for being the most valuable metal of the time. Osun is worshiped at rivers and waterfalls, and more rarely, near mineral water sources. She is a symbol of sensitivity and is identified by weeping.

Candomblé
In Candomblé Bantu, Osun is called Nkisi Ndandalunda, the Lady of Fertility and Moon. Hongolo and Kisimbi have similarities with Osun, and the three are often confused.

In Candomblé Ketu, Osun is the deity of fresh water; the patron of gestation and fecundity; and receives the prayers of women who wish to have children and protect them during pregnancy. Osun also protects small children until they begin to speak; she is affectionately called "Mamãe" ("Mama") by her devotees.

Plants associated with Osun in Brazil are aromatic, sweet, and often yellow, reflecting the qualities of the Orisha. They include mints (Lamiacaea). Osun is associated with the folha-de-dez-réis (Hydrocotyle cybelleta), a plant of the pennywort family. Many species are brilliant yellow, reflecting Osun's association with gold and wealth. She is also associated with folha-da-fortuna, or Kalanchoe pinnata.

Santeria

Ozun is another major Orisha that is distinct from Oṣun, the latter whom is also called "Oshun" and "Ochún" in the Santería religion of the Caribbean (Cuba, Puerto Rico and Trinidad) brought over by Yoruba people during the transatlantic slave trade. While Ozun is a masculine Orisha associated with John the Baptist, Ochún is syncretized with Our Lady of Charity.

Violín for Osun

A violín is a type of musical ceremony in Regla de Ocha performed for Osún. It includes both European classical music and Cuban popular music.

References

Further reading
 Ajiabde, G. Olusola. Negotiating Performance: Osun in the Verbal and Visual Metaphors, Bayreuth, Working Papers, 2005.
 Afolabi, Kayode. Osun Osogbo - Sacred People and Sacred Places, Charleston 2006.
 Badejo, Diedre, Oshun Seegesi: The Elegant Deity of Wealth, Power, and Femininity, Asmara 1996.
 De La Torre, Miguel A., "Dancing with Ochún: Imagining How a Black Goddess Became White," in Black Religion and Aesthetics: Religious Thought and Life in Africa and the African Diaspora, Anthony Pinn, ed., Cambridge University Press, pp. 113–134.
 Fakayode, Fayemi Fatunde, Osun: The Manly Woman, Athelia Henrietta Press 2004.
 Murphy, Joseph M.; Sanford, Mei-Mei. Osun Across the Waters: A Yoruba Goddess in African and the Americas. Bloomington: Indiana University Press, 2001. 
 Probst, Peter, Osogbo and the Art of Heritage : Monuments, Deities, and Money. Bloomington: Indiana University Press, 2011.

External links
Santeria.fr All about Oshun

Brazilian deities
Folk saints
Yoruba goddesses
Love and lust deities
Love and lust goddesses
Santería
Beauty goddesses
Knowledge goddesses
Fertility goddesses
Sea and river goddesses